Hohe Elbgeest is an Amt ("common administration for several smaller municipalities") in the district of Lauenburg, in Schleswig-Holstein, Germany. It is situated approximately 7 km north of Geesthacht, and 27 km east of Hamburg. Its seat is in Dassendorf.

In 2008, the Amt of Aumühle-Wohltorf was disbanded and its municipalities (Aumühle, Wohltorf, and the unincorporated area of Sachsenwald) were folded into Hohe Elbgeest.

Municipalities
The Amt Hohe Elbgeest consists of the following municipalities (population in 2005 between brackets):

Aumühle (3,088)
Börnsen (3,822)
Dassendorf (3,105)
Escheburg (3,036)
Hamwarde (751)
Hohenhorn (443)
Kröppelshagen-Fahrendorf (1,082)
Wiershop (173)
Wohltorf (2,264)
Worth (171)
Sachsenwald, unincorporated area

Ämter in Schleswig-Holstein